Ethnic and Racial Studies is a peer-reviewed social science academic journal that publishes scholarly articles and book reviews on anthropology, cultural studies, ethnicity and race, and sociology. The editors-in-chief are Martin Bulmer (University of Surrey) and John Solomos (University of Warwick).

According to the Journal Citation Reports, the journal has a 2014 impact factor of 0.956, ranking it 58th out of 142 journals in the category "Sociology", and 5th out of 15 journals in the category "Ethnic Studies".

References

External links 

Sociology journals
Taylor & Francis academic journals
Publications established in 1978
English-language journals
Ethnic studies journals